Technically, all scientific experiments measure a change in hypothesized causal behavior, and may drop the behavioral prefix.

Behavioral experiment may refer to:
 Behavioral experiment (analysis)
 Behavioral experiment (animals), for controlling variables (vs. field studies)
 Behavioral experiment (cognitive science), for determining what constitutes intelligent behavior
 Behavioral experiment (cognitive therapy), method for cognitive restructuring
 Behavioral experiment (cognitive behavioral therapy), for testing the validity of negative and alternative thoughts in real-life situations
 Behavioral experiment (computational modeling), of computational model for comparison with human data
 Behavioral experiment (experimental psychology), for measuring reaction time, choices among alternatives, and/or response rate or strength
 Behavioral experiment (human reasoning), for studying human reasoning
 Behavioral experiment (conditional reasoning), on conditionals in the psychology of reasoning
 Behavioral experiment (psychotherapy), for identifying potentially negative or harmful beliefs

See also 
 Behavioral experiments for monotropism
 Behaviorism, which is based on such experiments
 Experiment
 :Category:Science experiments
 
 Behavior
 
 

Science experiments